Akihiro Higuchi, also known by the alias Higuchinsky, is a Ukrainian-born film director known for directing the 2000 film Uzumaki, an adaptation of the manga of the same name by Junji Ito. Higuchinsky also directed Long Dream, a 2000 television film adaptation of Nagai Yume, another story by Ito. Additionally, Higuchinsky directed the 2003 film Tokyo 10+01, and helmed an episode of a television series adaptation of the manga Eko Eko Azarak.

References

Bibliography

External links

Ukrainian male artists
Ukrainian film directors
Horror film directors
Living people
Year of birth missing (living people)
Japanese film directors